Philip Julius Todt (August 9, 1901 – November 15, 1973), nicknamed "Hook", was a first baseman in Major League Baseball who played between the  and  seasons. He was born in Saint Louis, Missouri.

A fine defensive first baseman and consistent line drive hitter, Todt entered the majors in 1924 with the Boston Red Sox, hitting .262 in 52 games as a backup for Joe Harris. Since 1925, Todt provided a solid defensive effort for a Red Sox club that finished last in the American League for six straight seasons. He was considered in the American League MVP vote for three consecutive years (1925–1927), and led the AL first basemen in fielding percentage (.997) in 1928. His most productive season came in 1925, when he hit .278 with 62 runs and 75 RBI, all career-numbers. 

In 1930, Todt broke Babe Ruth's team record of 49 career home runs.  Todt's record stood until 1937, when Jimmie Foxx broke it in only his second season with the club; the record subsequently passed from Foxx to Ted Williams who still holds it.

Todt also appeared in 62 games with the Philadelphia Athletics in 1931, his last major league season.

In an eight-year career, Todt was a .258 hitter (880-for-3415) with 57 home runs and 453 RBI in 957 games, including 372 runs, 183 doubles, 58 triples, 29 stolen bases, and a .305 on-base percentage. In 904 games at first base, he collected 9079 outs and 623 assists while committing 80 errors in 9782 chances for a .992 fielding percentage. He also played four games in the outfield.

Personal life

Todt's father was a German immigrant who worked and lived at St Peter and St Paul's Cemetery in St. Louis, Missouri; Todt was born in a house in the cemetery. Todt died at the age of 72 in St. Louis, and is buried in the cemetery where he was born.

Milestone
 Todt ranks 3rd on the all-time season leaders with a 12.21 range factor (1926), behind Jiggs Donahue (12.65, 1907; 12.35, 1908) and over George Burns (12.10, 1914) and Stuffy McInnis (12.10, 1918).

External links

Phil Todt at SABR (Baseball BioProject)
Phil Todt at Baseball Library

1901 births
1973 deaths
Major League Baseball first basemen
Boston Red Sox players
Philadelphia Athletics players
Baseball players from St. Louis
St. Paul Saints (AA) managers